Mantua is an unincorporated settlement in West Hants, Nova Scotia, Canada. The 45th parallel – halfway between the equator and North Pole – passes through Mantua.

Transportation
Mantua can be reached by road.

Mantua was formerly served by the Dominion Atlantic Railway.

Mantua is located west of the Meander River.

Fossils
Pine fossils have been found in Mantua.

References

Communities in Hants County, Nova Scotia